Carlo Orsi (Pavia – London, 1894) was an Italian painter and sculptor.

Biography
He was a resident of Florence. In 1884 at the Exposition of Turin, he displayed: Ore calde; in 1887 at Venice: a painting on porcelain; in 1886 at Florence: Avanzi di un' antica villa presso Lastra a Signa; Vendemmiatrice; Il porto di Rapallo; Prime note. Finally at the 1889 Exhibition of Florence: Imitazione arazzo. In 1885 he painted: I polli del l'augure. He also painted fresco murals at the church of the Consolata of Vigevano and the Palazzo Carignano of Turin. The Royal Academy of London has a portrait of John Addington Symonds, by Carlo Orsi.

References

1894 deaths
Artists from Pavia
19th-century Italian painters
Italian male painters
Painters from Tuscany
Year of birth missing
Fresco painters
19th-century Italian male artists